Aeq or AEQ may refer to:

Language
 aeq., an abbreviation meaning "equal"
 Aer language, ISO 639 code aeq
 Aequian language, abbreviated Aeq.

Publications
 Adult Education Quarterly
 Air Enthusiast Quarterly
 Anthropology & Education Quarterly
 Applied Economics Quarterly, published by the German Institute for Economic Research

Transport
 Ar Horqin Airport (IATA code AEQ)
 Air Express Sweden (ICAO airline designator AEQ)